This is a list of awards and nominations received by American filmmaker Barry Jenkins.

Jenkins is an American film director, screenwriter, and producer known for his feature films, Moonlight (2016), an adaptation of the Tarell Alvin McCraney play In Moonlight Black Boys Look Blue and If Beale Street Could Talk (2018) an adaptation of James Baldwin's acclaimed novel of the same name. He is also known for direction "Episode V" of the Netflix series Dear White People and for direction the Amazon Prime Video limited series The Underground Railroad (2021) based on the Colson Whitehead novel of the same name, for which he was nominated for a Primetime Emmy Award for Outstanding Directing for a Limited Series, Movie, or Dramatic Special and won the BAFTA TV Award for Best International Programme.

He has received three Academy Award nominations winning Best Adapted Screenplay for Moonlight (2016). He also received nominations from the British Academy Film Awards, the Golden Globe Awards, and the Directors Guild of America.

For his work of Moonlight, Jenkins became the first black filmmaker to ever sweep "The Big Four" critics awards for directing category (LA, NBR, NY, NSFC).

Major associations

Academy Awards

BAFTA Awards

Directors Guild Awards

Golden Globe Awards

Primetime Emmy Awards

Writers Guild of America Awards

Other awards and nominations

Black Reel Awards

Critics' Choice Awards

Critics' Choice Television Awards

Gotham Awards

Independent Spirit Award

NAACP Image Awards

Satellite Awards

Critics awards

References

External links 

 

Lists of awards received by film director